The 1994 ADAC Super Touren Wagen Cup was the first edition of the Super Tourenwagen Cup (STW).

Teams and drivers

Race calendar and winners

Championship results

External links 

Super Tourenwagen Cup
Super Tourenwagen Cup Season
Touring Car Championship season